Sømna is a municipality in Nordland county, Norway. It is part of the Helgeland traditional region. The administrative center of Sømna is the village of Vik i Helgeland. Other villages in the municipality include Dalbotn, Sund, Vennesund, and Berg.

The oldest boat remains ever found in Norway (Haugvikbåten - 2,500 years old) was discovered in a bog in Sømna.

Sømna has some of the best agriculture in the region. Dairy and beef cows as well as grains are produced in Sømna. There is also a dairy in Berg that produces milk and cheese.

The  municipality is the 301st largest by area out of the 356 municipalities in Norway. Sømna is the 280th most populous municipality in Norway with a population of 1,981.

General information
The municipality of Vik was established on 1 January 1901 when it was separated from the large municipality of Brønnøy. The initial population of Vik was 2,731. In 1941 the municipality was renamed Sømna. During the 1960s, there were many municipal mergers across Norway due to the work of the Schei Committee. On 1 January 1964, a major municipal merger took place. The following areas were merged to form a new, larger Brønnøy municipality.
the town of Brønnøysund (population: 2,064)
the municipality of Sømna (population: 2,347)
the municipality of Brønnøy (population: 2,635)
the municipality of Velfjord (population: 1,380)
the part of Bindal municipality located Lande-Tosbotn area around the inner Bindalsfjorden (population: 296)

This merger was short-lived because on 1 January 1977, all of the old Sømna municipality (except the Hongsetbygda area) was removed from Brønnøy to become a separate municipality once again. There were 2,107 residents in the newly recreated Sømna municipality.

Name
The Old Norse form of the name was probably Søfn. The meaning of the name is unknown, but it is possibly derived from sveifa which means "wind" or "wave" or it could be derived from svefja meaning a "quiet sleep".

Coat of arms
The coat of arms was granted on 14 June 1991. The official blazon is "Gules, three trefoils argent in pall stems conjoined". This means the arms have a red field (background) and the charge is a group of three clover leaves (trefoils). The clover has a tincture of argent which means it is commonly colored white, but if it is made out of metal, then silver is used. The arms symbolize agriculture, culture, and prosperity combined. The arms were designed by Rolf Tidemann.

Churches
The Church of Norway has one parish within the municipality of Sømna. It is part of the Sør-Helgeland prosti (deanery) in the Diocese of Sør-Hålogaland.

Geography and climate
The municipality of Sømna is mostly made up of the southern part of a peninsula off the mainland of Norway and the surrounding islands. It borders Brønnøy to the north by land and Bindal to the south and east by sea, across the Bindalsfjorden.
Sømna consists mainly of a wide Strandflaten lowland (coastal brim), and is one of few municipalities in Northern Norway where the farmers still grow some grain.

Sømna has an oceanic climate with few temperature extremes, similar to Brønnøysund. However, Sømna has one national heat record: The warmest night ever recorded in Norway was July 29, 2019 at Sømna-Kvaløyfjellet (302 m) in Sømna with overnight low .

Government
All municipalities in Norway, including Sømna, are responsible for primary education (through 10th grade), outpatient health services, senior citizen services, unemployment and other social services, zoning, economic development, and municipal roads. The municipality is governed by a municipal council of elected representatives, which in turn elect a mayor.  The municipality falls under the Brønnøy District Court and the Hålogaland Court of Appeal.

Municipal council
The municipal council of Sømna is made up of 17 representatives that are elected to four year terms. The party breakdown of the council is as follows:

Mayor
The mayors of Sømna (incomplete list):
2005-2015: Edmund Dahle (Sp)
2015-2015: Hans Gunnar Holand (Sp)
2015-2019: Andrine Solli Oppegaard (Ap)
2019–present: Hans Gunnar Holand (Sp)

Notable people 
 August Nielsen (1877 in Vik at Sømna – 1956) a Norwegian architect
 Ludvig Enge (1878 in Vik i Helgeland – 1953) a Norwegian civil servant and politician
 Dag Skogheim (1928 in Sømna – 2015) a teacher, poet, novelist, short story writer, biographer and non-fiction writer

Gallery

References

External links

Municipal fact sheet from Statistics Norway 
Sømna kommune 

 
Municipalities of Nordland
1901 establishments in Norway
1964 disestablishments in Norway
1977 establishments in Norway